President's House, also referred to as Hatter Hall, is a historic home located on the campus of Bluefield State University at Bluefield, West Virginia.  It was built in 1930 and named after President Hamilton Hatter, and is a brick, -story, Colonial Revival-style dwelling.  It has one bay side wings and a hipped roof.  Also on the property is a stone garage.  The house was used as the residence for the college president until 1966.

It was listed on the National Register of Historic Places in 1999.

References

Houses on the National Register of Historic Places in West Virginia
Colonial Revival architecture in West Virginia
Houses completed in 1930
Bluefield State College
Houses in Mercer County, West Virginia
National Register of Historic Places in Mercer County, West Virginia
University and college buildings on the National Register of Historic Places in West Virginia
Buildings and structures in Bluefield, West Virginia